The Chinese Ambassador to Kenya is the official representative of the People's Republic of China to the Republic of Kenya.

List of representatives

References 

 
Kenya
China